Goran Tošić and Denis Zivkovic were the defending champions; however, Tošić did not participate.
Zivkovic teamed up with Vahid Mirzadeh and lost to Radu Albot and Victor Crivoi in the Quarterfinals.
Jonathan Eysseric and Nicolas Renavand defeated Ilija Vučić and Miljan Zekić 6–7(8–6), 6–2, [10–7] in the finals.

Seeds

Draw

Draw

References
 Main Draw

BRD Timisoara Challenger - Doubles
2013 Doubles